Aud the Deep-Minded or Auðr the Deep-Minded may refer to:

 Auðr the Deep-Minded (Ívarsdóttir), 7th/8th century Norse princess
 Aud the Deep-Minded (Ketilsdóttir), 9th century settler in Iceland

See also
Aud (disambiguation)#People (for other people with the same name)